Nueve de Julio is a town in the province of San Juan, Argentina.

References

 

Populated places in San Juan Province, Argentina
Cities in Argentina
Argentina
San Juan Province, Argentina